The 1982–83 Georgia Southern Eagles men's basketball team represented Georgia Southern University during the 1982–83 NCAA Division I men's basketball season. The Eagles, led by first year head coach Frank Kerns, played their home games at Hanner Fieldhouse in Statesboro, Georgia as members of the Trans America Athletic Conference. The team finished third in the regular season conference standings and won the TAAC tournament to earn an automatic bid to the NCAA tournament – the first appearance in program history. As one of two No. 12 seeds in the Mideast region, the Eagles lost in the Play-in round to Robert Morris, 64–54 to finish with a 18–12 record (8–6 TAAC).

Roster

Schedule and results

|-
!colspan=12 style=| Non-conference Regular season

|-
!colspan=12 style=| TAAC Regular season

|-
!colspan=12 style=| TAAC tournament

|-
!colspan=12 style=| NCAA tournament

Source

References

Georgia Southern Eagles men's basketball seasons
Georgia Southern
Georgia Southern
Georgia Southern Eagles men's basketball
Georgia Southern Eagles men's basketball